Vigolzone is a comune (municipality) in the Province of Piacenza in the Italian region Emilia-Romagna, located about  northwest of Bologna and about  south of Piacenza. 

Vigolzone borders the following municipalities: Bettola, Podenzano, Ponte dell'Olio, Rivergaro, San Giorgio Piacentino, Travo.

In the early 20th century, the frazione of Grazzano received the name Visconti when Giuseppe Visconti, father of the filmmaker Luchino, restored the medieval castle built there by Gian Galeazzo Visconti.

References

External links
 Official website

Cities and towns in Emilia-Romagna